The LM-X License Manager is a license management tool that protects software products against piracy. It is used by Independent Software Vendors (ISV) to implement some of the Software Asset Management practices. related to monitoring of the usage of existing applications and adding new licenses wherever requested by end-. ISV can control their license policies externally from applications, and enforce various levels of security.

LM-X software license manager can be run on a number of platforms including Windows, Linux, and Mac OS X.

Features
 System Clock Check
 Automatic Server Discovery
 Manual and automatic heartbeats
 License Borrowing and Grace Licensing
 Pay Per Use
 License Replacement
 Web-based License Management

See also
 Copy protection
 Digital rights management
 Floating licensing
 License borrowing
 List of license managers
 Product activation

References

[1] https://www.itassetmanagement.net/wp-content/uploads/2015/02/ITAM_A4WHITEPAPER_SOFTWAREASSETMANAGEMENT_UNLOCKED.pdf

External links
 Official web page

Security software